We Believe is the second live album by American Christian worship duo Brian & Jenn Johnson. The album was released on September 26, 2006, by Bethel Music, alongside Found Records, EMI and Kingsway Music. Jeremy Edwardson, Brian Johnson and Steven Tracy worked together on the production of the album. The album was recorded live at Bethel Church in Redding, California.

Critical reception

Aaron Ferris of Cross Rhythms rated the album nine squares out of a possible ten, saying: "The varied writing will attract those whose preference may lie outside the boundaries of the present day worship genre but satisfactorily meeting the tastes of the uncompromising worship appreciator." Worshipmusic.com's Jeremy Dunn had positive impressions of the album, saying "Those of you that like your live worship authentic and fresh will love this CD." In a review for Gateway News, Michael Keef concludes as follows: "Brian and Jenn both express a deep love and passion for the Lord and this, expressed through their unique sound, helps one to enjoy God-focussed worship, where one can either sing along or simply listen and allow the words to wash you."

Track listing

Personnel
Adapted from AllMusic, and Barnes and Noble.

 Joseph Choi – electric guitar
 Marc Cooper – electric guitar
 Jeremy Edwardson – engineer, producer, programming
 Adam French – Pro-Tools
 Ainslie Grosser – mixing, Pro-Tools
 Brian Johnson – engineer, executive producer, acoustic guitar, electric guitar, primary artist, producer, Pro-Tools, vocals
 Jenn Johnson – piano, primary artist, background vocals, vocals
 Michael Joyce – bass, engineer, Pro-Tools, programming
 Joel Kilmer – electric guitar
 Ian McIntosh – Fender Rhodes, keyboards, piano
 Marc Pusch – executive producer
 Chris Quilala – drums
 Steven Tracy – electric guitar, engineer, Fender Rhodes, producer, programming
 Kim Walker – background vocals
 Michael Wilson – photography

Charts

Release history

References

2006 live albums
Brian & Jenn Johnson albums
Live Christian music albums